Deportation is the expulsion of a person or group of people from a place or country. The term expulsion is often used as a synonym for deportation, though expulsion is more often used in the context of international law, while deportation is more used in national (municipal) law. Forced displacement or forced migration of an individual or a group may be caused by deportation, for example ethnic cleansing, and other reasons. A person who has been deported or is under sentence of deportation is called a deportee.

Definition

Definitions of deportation apply equally to nationals and foreigners. Nonetheless, in the common usage the expulsion of foreign nationals is usually called deportation, whereas the expulsion of nationals is called extradition, banishment, exile, or penal transportation. For example, in the United States:
"Strictly speaking, transportation, extradition, and deportation, although each has the effect of removing a person from the country, are different things, and have different purposes. Transportation is by way of punishment of one convicted of an offense against the laws of the country. Extradition is the surrender to another country of one accused of an offense against its laws, there to be tried, and, if found guilty, punished. Deportation is the removal of an alien out of the country, simply because his presence is deemed inconsistent with the public welfare and without any punishment being imposed or contemplated either under the laws of the country out of which he is sent or of those of the country to which he is taken."

Expulsion is an act by a public authority to remove a person or persons against his or her will from the territory of that state. A successful expulsion of a person by a country is called a deportation.

According to the European Court of Human Rights, collective expulsion is any measure compelling non-nationals, as a group, to leave a country, except where such a measure is taken on the basis of a reasonable and objective examination of the particular case of each individual non-national of the group. Mass expulsion may also occur when members of an ethnic group are sent out of a state regardless of nationality. Collective expulsion, or expulsion en masse, is prohibited by several instruments of international law.

History

Deportations widely occurred in ancient history, and is well-recorded particularly in ancient Mesopotamia.

Deportation in the Assyrian Empire
 Mass deportations of conquered nations, including Jewish Assyrian captivity.

Deportation in the Achaemenid Empire
Deportation was practiced as a policy toward rebellious people in Achaemenid Empire. The precise legal status of the deportees is unclear; but ill-treatment is not recorded. Instances include:

Deportation in the Parthian Empire

Unlike in the Achaemenid and Sassanian periods, records of deportation are rare during the Arsacid Parthian period. One notable example was the deportation of the Mards in Charax, near Rhages (Ray) by Phraates I. The 10,000 Roman prisoners of war after the Battle of Carrhae appear to have been deported to Alexandria Margiana (Merv) near the eastern border in 53 BC, who are said to married to local people. It is hypothesized that some of them founded the Chinese city of Li-Jien after becoming soldiers for the Hsiung-nu, but this is doubted.

Hyrcanus II, the Jewish king of Judea (Jerusalem), was settled among the Jews of Babylon in Parthia after being taken as captive by the Parthian-Jewish forces in 40 BC.

Roman POWs in the Antony's Parthian War may have suffered deportation.

Deportation in the Sasanian Empire

Deportation was widely used by the Sasanians, especially during the wars with the Romans.

During Shapur I's reign, the Romans (including Valerian) who were defeated at the Battle of Edessa were deported to Persis. Other destinations were Parthia, Khuzestan, and Asorestan. There were cities which were founded and were populated by Romans prisoners of war, including Shadh-Shapur (Dayr Mikhraq) in Meshan, Bishapur in Persis, Wuzurg-Shapur (Ukbara; Marw-Ḥābūr), and Gundeshapur. Agricultural land were also given to the deportees. These deportations initiated the spread Christianity in the Sassanian empire. In Rēw-Ardashīr (Rishahr; Yarānshahr), Persis, there was a church for the Romans and another one for Carmanians. Their hypothesized decisive role in the spread of Christianity in Persia and their major contribution to Persian economy has been recently criticized by Mosig-Walburg (2010). In the mid-3rd century, Greek-speaking deportees from north-western Syria were settled in Kashkar, Mesopotamia.

After the Arab incursion into Persia during Shapur II's reign, he scattered the defeated Arab tribes by deporting them to other regions. Some were deported to Bahrain and Kirman, possibly to both populate these unattractive regions (due to their climate) and bringing the tribes under control.

In 395 AD, 18,000 Roman populations of Sophene, Armenia, Mesopotamia, Syria, and Cappadocia were captured and deported by the "Huns". the prisoners were freed by the Persians as they reached Persia, and were settled in Slōk (Wēh Ardashīr) and Kōkbā (Kōkhē). The author of the text Liber Calipharum has praised the king Yazdegerd I (399–420) for his treatment of the deportees, who also allowed some to return.

Major deportations occurred during the Anastasian War, including Kavad I's deportation of the populations of Theodosiopolis and Amida to Arrajan (Weh-az-Amid Kavad).

Major deportations occurred during the campaigns of Khosrau I from the Roman cities of Sura, Beroea, Antioch, Apamea, Callinicum, and Batnai in Osrhoene, to Wēh-Antiyōk-Khosrow (also known as Rūmagān; in Arabic: al-Rūmiyya). The city was founded near Ctesiphon especially for them, and Khosrow reportedly "did everything in his power to make the residents want to stay". The number of the deportees is recorded to be 292,000 in another source.

Military occupation
Article 49 of the Fourth Geneva Convention prohibits the deportation of people into or out of occupied territory under belligerent military occupation:

External deportation

All countries reserve the right to deport persons without right of abode even those who are longtime residents or possess permanent residency. In general, foreigners who have committed serious crimes, entered the country illegally, overstayed or broken the conditions of their visa, or otherwise lost their legal status to remain in the country may be administratively removed or deported. In some cases, even citizens can be deported; some of the countries in the Persian Gulf have deported their own citizens. They have paid the Comoros to give them passports and accept them.

In many cases, deportation is done by the government's executive apparatus, and as such is often subject to a simpler legal process (or none), with reduced or no right to trial, legal representation or appeal due to the subject's lack of citizenship. In the 1930s, during the Great Depression, more stringent enforcement of immigration laws were ordered by the executive branch of the U.S. government, which led to increased deportation and repatriation to Mexico. In the 1930s, during the Great Depression, between 355,000 and 2 million Mexicans and Mexican Americans were deported or repatriated to Mexico, an estimated 40 to 60% of whom were U.S. citizens - overwhelmingly children. At least 82,000 Mexicans were formally deported between 1929 and 1935 by the government. Voluntary repatriations were more common than deportations. In 1954, the executive branch of the U.S. government implemented Operation Wetback, a program created in response to public hysteria about immigration and immigrants from Mexico. Operation Wetback led to the deportation of nearly 1.3 million Mexicans from the United States. Between 2009 and 2016, about 3.2 million people were deported from the United States. Since 1997 U.S. mass deportations of non-citizens particularly convicted felons have risen steadily with the passing into law by the U.S. Congress of the 1996 Illegal Immigration Reform and Responsibility Act (IIRRA) which brought sweeping changes to the threshold for deportation of convicted felons that have been criticized by some as having human rights abuses. Since this time, the former U.S. Immigration and Naturalization Services (INS) has been transformed into Immigration and Customs Enforcement (ICE) and has renamed deportation as "expedited removal". The ICE website publishes removal statistics annually on its website. According to recent numbers ICE removed a total of 240,255 aliens in FY 2016, a two percent increase over FY 2015, but a 24 percent decrease from FY 2014.

Already in natural law of the 18th century, philosophers agreed that expulsion of a nation from the territory that it historically inhabits is not allowable. In the late 20th century, the United Nations drafted a code related to crimes against humanity; Article 18 of the Draft Code of Crimes Against the Peace and Security of Mankind declares "large scale" arbitrary or forcible deportation to be a crime against humanity.

Deportation often requires a specific process that must be validated by a court or senior government official. It should not be confused with administrative removal, which is the process of a country denying entry to individuals at a port of entry and expelling them.

Internal deportation

Deportation can also happen within a state, when (for example) an individual or a group of people is forcibly resettled to a different part of the country. If ethnic groups are affected by this, it may also be referred to as population transfer. The rationale is often that these groups might assist the enemy in war or insurrection. For example, the American state of Georgia deported 400 female mill workers during the Civil War on the suspicion they were Northern sympathizers.

In the 18th Century the Tipu Sultan, of Mysore, deported tens of thousands of civilians, from lands he had annexed, to serve as slave labour in other parts of his empire, for example the: Captivity of Mangalorean Catholics at Seringapatam.

During World War II, Joseph Stalin (see Population transfer in the Soviet Union) ordered the deportation of Volga Germans, Chechens, Crimean Tatars, Ukrainians and others to areas away from the front, including central and western Soviet Union. Some historians have estimated the number of deaths from the deportation to be as high as 1 in 3 among some populations. On February 26, 2004 the European Parliament characterized deportations of the Chechens as an act of genocide.

The Soviet Union also used deportation, as well as instituting the Russian language as the only working language and other such tactics, to achieve Russification of its occupied territories (such as the Baltic nations and Bessarabia). In this way, it removed the historical ethnic populations and repopulated the areas with Russian nationals. The deported people were sent to remote, scarcely populated areas or to GULAG labour camps. It has been estimated that, in their entirety, internal forced migrations affected some 6 million people. Of these, some 1 to 1.5 million perished.

After World War II approximately 50,000 Hungarians were deported from South Slovakia by Czechoslovak authorities to the Czech borderlands in order to alter the ethnic composition of the region. Between 110,000 and 120,000 Japanese and Japanese Americans on the West Coast, as well as about 3,000 Italian American and about 11,500 German American families, were forcibly resettled from the coasts to internment camps in interior areas of the United States of America by President Franklin Roosevelt.

In the late 19th and early 20th century, deportation of union members and labor leaders was not uncommon in the United States during strikes or labor disputes. For an example, see the Bisbee Deportation.

Colonial deportations

Deporting individuals to an overseas colony is a special case that is neither completely internal nor external.  For example, from 1717 onwards, Great Britain deported around 40,000 British religious objectors and "criminals" to America before the practice ceased in 1776. Jailers sold the "criminals" to shipping contractors, who then sold them to plantation owners. The "criminals" worked for the plantation owner for the duration of their sentence. After Britain lost control of the area which became the United States, Australia became the destination for "criminals" deported to British colonies. Britain transported more than 160,000 British "criminals" to the Australian colonies between 1787 and 1855.

It may help deporting authorities to have access to a far-flung empire. During the Second Boer War of 1899-1902 the British deported about 26,000 Boer prisoners-of-war to overseas POW camps in Saint Helena, Ceylon, Bermuda and India.

Medical deportation
Russia expelled dozens of Chinese for violating their terms of quarantine in 2020.

Deportation during World War II

Deportation in Nazi Germany

Nazi policies deported homosexuals, Jews, Poles, and Romani from their established places of residence to Nazi concentration camps or extermination camps set up at a considerable distance from their original residences. During the Holocaust, the Nazis made heavy use of euphemisms, where "deportation" frequently meant the victims were subsequently murdered, as opposed to simply being relocated.

Deportation in the Soviet Union

Under orders of Joseph Stalin the Soviet Union carried out a forced transfer of various groups before, during and after World War II (from 1930s up to the 1950s). During the June deportation of 1941, after the occupation of the Baltic countries, Eastern Poland and Moldavia, as was agreed by the Soviet Union and Nazi Germany in the Molotov–Ribbentrop Pact, in an attempt to subdue the countries for their forced incorporation into the Soviet Union, the Soviet Union deported tens-of-thousands of innocent people to Siberia.

Deportation in the Independent State of Croatia
 
An estimated 120,000 Serbs were deported from the Independent State of Croatia to German-occupied Serbia, and 300,000 fled by 1943.

Noteworthy deportees

Alexander Berkman, Emma Goldman, C.L.R. James, Claudia Jones, Fritz Julius Kuhn, Lucky Luciano, and Anna Sage were all deported from the United States by being arrested and brought to the federal immigration control station on Ellis Island in New York Harbor and, from there, forcibly removed from the United States on ships.

Opposition

Many criticize deportations, calling them inhuman, as the questioning the effectiveness of deportations. Some are completely opposed towards any deportations, while others state it is inhuman to take somebody to a foreign land without their consent.

In popular culture
In literature, deportation appears as an overriding theme in the 1935 novel, Strange Passage by Theodore D. Irwin.
Films depicting or dealing with fictional cases of deportation are many and varied. Among them are Ellis Island (1936), Exile Express (1939), Five Came Back (1939), Deported (1950), and Gambling House (1951). More recently, Shottas (2002) treated the issue of U.S. deportation to the Caribbean post-1997.

See also

 Ethnic cleansing
 Forced migration
 Acadian deportation
 Diaspora
 Depopulation of Diego Garcia
 Flight and expulsion of Germans (1944–50)
 Impediment to expulsion
 Indian Removal Act
 Israelite deportation
 June deportation
 Operation Priboi
 Penal transportation
 Population transfer
 Population transfer in the Soviet Union
 Prussian deportations of 1885–1890
 Seminole Wars
 Soviet deportations from Estonia

Further reading

 Garrity, Meghan (2022). "Introducing the Government-Sponsored Mass Expulsion Dataset". Journal of Peace Research.

References
Notes

Bibliography

 Aguila, Jaime R. "Book Reviews: Decade of Betrayal: Mexican Repatriation in the 1930s. By Francisco E. Balderrama and Raymond Rodríguez". Journal of San Diego History. 52:3–4 (Summer-Fall 2006).
 Balderrama, Francisco and Rodriguez, Raymond. Decade of Betrayal: Mexican Repatriation in the 1930s. Albuquerque: University of New Mexico Press, 1995. .
 Campana, Aurélie. "Case Study: The Massive Deportation of the Chechen People: How and why Chechens were Deported". Online Encyclopedia of Mass Violence. November 2007. Accessed August 11, 2008.
 Christensen, Peter. The Decline of Iranshahr: Irrigation and Environments in the History of the Middle East, 500 B.C. to A.D. 1500 Copenhagen, Denmark: Museum Tusculanum Press, 1993. .
 Conquest, Robert. The Nation Killers. New York: Macmillan, 1970. 
 Daniels, Roger. Coming to America: A History of Immigration and Ethnicity in American Life. New York: HarperCollins, 2002. 
 Dillman, Caroline Matheny. The Roswell Mills and A Civil War Tragedy: Excerpts From Days Gone by in Alpharetta and Roswell, Georgia. Vol. 1. Roswell, Ga.: Chattahoochee Press, 1996. 
 Fischer, Ruth and Leggett, John C. Stalin and German Communism: A Study in the Origins of the State Party. Edison, N.J.: Transaction Publishers, 2006. 
 Forsythe, David P. and Lawson, Edward. Encyclopedia of Human Rights. 2d ed. Florence, Ky.: Taylor & Francis, 1996.
 Fragomen, Austin T. and Bell, Steven C. Immigration Fundamentals: A Guide to Law and Practice. New York: Practising Law Institute, 1996. 
 García, Juan Ramon. Operation Wetback: The Mass Deportation of Mexican Undocumented Workers in 1954. Westport, Ct.: Greenwood Publishing Group, 1980. .
 Gibney,Matthew J. and Hansen, Randall. "Deportation and the Liberal State: The Involuntary Return of Asylum Seekers and Unlawful Migrants in Canada, the UK, and Germany". New Issues in Refugee Research: Working Paper Series No. 77. Geneva, Switzerland: United Nations High Commissioner for Refugees, 2003.
 Gutiérrez, David G. Walls and Mirrors: Mexican Americans, Mexican Immigrants, and the Politics of Ethnicity. Berkeley, Calif.: University of California Press, 1995. 
 
 Hing, Bill Ong. Defining America Through Immigration Policy. Philadelphia, Pa.: Temple University Press, 2004. 
 Hitt, Michael D. Charged with Treason: The Ordeal of 400 Mill Workers During Military Operations in Roswell, Georgia, 1864–1865. Monroe, N.Y.: Library Research Associates, 1992. 
 International Law Commission. United Nations. Yearbook of the International Law Commission 1996: Report of the Commission to the General Assembly on the Work of Its 48th Session. New York: United Nations Publications, 2000. 
 
 Jaimoukha, Amjad M. The Chechens: A Handbook. Florence, Ky.: Routledge, 2005. 
 
 Kleveman, Lutz. The New Great Game: Blood and Oil in Central Asia. Jackson, Tenn.: Atlantic Monthly Press, 2003. 
 "The Law of Necessity As Applied in the Bisbee Deportation Case". Arizona Law Review. 3:2 (1961).
 "Lewis Attacks Deportation of Leaders by West Virginia Authorities". The New York Times. July 17, 1921.
 Lindquist, John H. and Fraser, James. "A Sociological Interpretation of the Bisbee Deportation". Pacific Historical Review. 37:4 (November 1968).
 López, Ian F. Haney. Racism on Trial: The Chicano Fight for Justice. New ed. Cambridge, Massachusetts: Belknap Press, 2004. 
 Martin, MaryJoy. The Corpse On Boomerang Road: Telluride's War on Labor, 1899–1908. Lake City, Colo.: Western Reflections Publishing Co., 2004. 
 Mata, Albert G. "Operation Wetback: The Mass Deportation of Mexican Undocumented Workers in 1954 by Juan Ramon García". Contemporary Sociology. 1:5 (September 1983)
 Mawdsley, Evan. The Stalin Years: The Soviet Union 1929–1953. Manchester, England: Manchester University Press, 2003. 
 McCaffray, Susan Purves and Melancon, Michael S. Russia in the European Context, 1789–1914: A Member of the Family. New York: Palgrave Macmillan, 2005.
 McKay, Robert R. "The Federal Deportation Campaign in Texas: Mexican Deportation from the Lower Rio Grande Valley during the Great Depression". Borderlands Journal. (Fall 1981).
 Naimark, Norman M. Fires of Hatred: Ethnic Cleansing in Twentieth-Century Europe. Cambridge, Massachusetts: Harvard University Press, 2001. 
 Nurbiyev, Aslan. "Relocation of Chechen 'Genocide' Memorial Opens Wounds". Agence France Press. June 4, 2008.
 
 President's Mediation Commission. Report on the Bisbee Deportations Made by the President's Mediation Commission to the President of the United States. Washington, D.C.: President's Mediation Commission, November 6, 1917.
 Silverberg, Louis G. "Citizens' Committees: Their Role in Industrial Conflict". Public Opinion Quarterly. 5:1 (March 1941).
 
 Suggs, Jr., George G. Colorado's War on Militant Unionism: James H. Peabody and the Western Federation of Miners. 2nd ed. Norman, Okla.: University of Oklahoma Press, 1991. 
 
 Valenciana, Christine. "Unconstitutional Deportation of Mexican Americans During the 1930s: A Family History and Oral History". Multicultural Education''. Spring 2006.

External links

 
Punishments
Extradition